V3903 Sagittarii (also known as 11 Sagittarii, or its abbreviation 11 Sgr) is an eclipsing binary star system in the constellation Sagittiarus.

John Flamsteed designated this star the Flamsteed designation 11 Sagittarii, although the designation 11 Sgr is now more often used to refer to the star he designated 1 Sagittarii.

Properties
The system consists of two hot main-sequence stars. The spectral types have historically been accepted as O7V and O9V, but the more recent Galactic O-Star Spectroscopic Survey gives a spectral type of O7V(n)z + B0:V:. The system is one of the youngest-known eclipsing binaries, and one of the few containing such massive stars that have not yet filled their roche lobes.

V3903 Sagittarii varies in brightness. The General Catalogue of Variable Stars lists it as a possible hot irregular Orion variable star, but it has been shown to be a detached eclipsing binary system. The two stars are detached, that is they do not fill their roche lobes, which makes it an Algol-type eclipsing variable. The period is one day, 18 hours, 52 minutes.

Later measurements have resulted in refined distances estimates of 1,070 pc and 1,200 pc.

References

Sagittarius (constellation)
O-type main-sequence stars
CD−24 13962
165921
Sagittarii, V3903
Orion variables
088943
J18091770-2359179
B-type main-sequence stars
Algol variables